Welgris Highlanders, formerly known as Welgris Momads, was a semi-professional Papua New Guinea football club based in Mount Hagen, but playing their home games in Goroka.

They were one of five founding members of the Papua New Guinea National Soccer League, but reached the knockout stages just once in four years of competing.

After a three-year hiatus, the side played their final NSL season in 2012–13, where they finished bottom of the league.

History

Foundation and early years 
The club was founded as Welgris Momads sometime at the start of the 21st century, as their first season on record came in 2001 when they took part in the Mount Hagen Regional League. Among seven participants they were the eventual champions. Two years later, they competed in both the Highlands Regional Championship and the Papua New Guinea National Club Championship, but failed to make an impact on either competition.

In 2005, the side took part in both the Highlands Regional Championship the National Club Championship for the second time. The club fared much better in both competitions, winning the Highlands competition with a 3–1 victory over Blue Kumuls Mount Hagen in the final on 22 August, before meeting Blue Kumuls again in the third-place playoff of the National Club Championship, this time winning 3–0.

National Soccer League debut 
From 18–21 May 2006, the side took part in the Highlands Regional Championship once again, reaching the final where they were set to play Blue Kumuls once again. However, the result of the final is unknown. Despite this, both sides were eligible for the 2006 National Club Championship, but Momads withdrew, and instead entered the inaugural season of the Papua New Guinea National Soccer League. Despite defeating eventual champions Hekari United 1–0 early in the season, they picked up just two wins from eight matches and finished bottom of the table, being the only side to fail to make the playoffs.

The following season, the side changed their name to Welgris Highlanders and entered the competition again. Among seven teams they finished 5th again, narrowly missing out on playoff qualification by two points. The side did, however, win the Fair Play Award. The 2007 Highlands Regional Championship was delayed to March 2008, with the final, once more against Blue Kumuls Mount Hagen, was due to be completed on 30 March 2008. However, the final wasn't played after an appeal was lodged regarding the eligibility of National Soccer League players participating in the tournament.

The club entered the eight-team 2008–09 season and finished third in the league table, qualifying for the playoffs for what would prove to be the first and last time. The side came up against champions Hekari in the semi-final, losing 1–0, before preparing to head to the Lloyd Robson Oval in Port Moresby on 21 March 2009 for the third-place match against University Inter, who had finished second in the table. However, after two postponements, the NSL board eventually cancelled both the third-place match and the final, leaving Welgris technically in 4th behind Inter due to their inferior regular season record.

Ahead of the 2009–10 season, it was reported that the side had merged with Rapatona FC, and for three years the Welgris Highlanders name would not be seen in domestic competition. On 14 April 2010, it was reported that the club was now defunct.

NSL return and disappearance 
Towards the end of 2012, it was reported that the side were making a return to the National Soccer League ahead of the delayed 2013 season. Indeed, the side were one of the eight teams taking part, but won just one match from 14 and finished bottom of the table. In October 2013, the side revealed they would be withdrawing from the upcoming 2014 season because the costs for taking part were too high, citing a change in the competition format as one of the primary reasons for this. It is assumed that the side disbanded shortly afterwards.

Honours

National competitions 

 Papua New Guinea National Club Championship
 Third: 2005

Regional competitions 

 Highlands Regional Championship
Champions: 2005

References 

Football clubs in Papua New Guinea